Sir Percy Alexander McElwaine KC (21 September 1884 – 24 October 1969) was a lawyer and judge who served, inter alia, as Attorney General of Fiji and Chief Justice of the Straits Settlements.

Early life
McElwaine was born in Roscommon, Ireland, and was educated at Campbell College in Belfast and at Trinity College Dublin. He was admitted to the Irish bar in 1908 and the Alberta bar in 1913. In the First World War, he was a temporary lieutenant in the Fourteenth Royal Irish Rifles.

Marriages
McElwaine married Evelyn Annie Forsaith Macnaught at St Mary Le Park in Battersea, London, on 17 June 1914. She died in the 1918 influenza epidemic on 10 November 1918. She was pregnant at the time of her death. His second wife, Margaret, was a popular socialite during their time in Singapore. They had two sons, David Eric and Ian Douglas.

Legal, political and judicial career
McElwaine was made acting Solicitor General of Kenya on 15 October 1925, and a nominated official (i.e., ex officio) member of the Legislative Council of Kenya on 28 October.

After being appointed a Senior Crown Counsel in British Kenya on 1 January 1926, McElwaine served another spell in the Legislative Council from 11 April 1927, when he was appointed to fill in for Frederick Gordon Smith during his absence. The appointment was evidently renewed on 11 May, but terminated on 4 August that year, on the permanent appointment of Thomas Dundas Hope Bruce.

McElwaine was subsequently Attorney General of Fiji from 1927 to 1931 under Governors Sir Eyre Hutson and Sir Arthur Fletcher. In 1930, he moved to Singapore to take up the position of Deputy Public Prosecutor. He went on to become Attorney General of the Straits Settlements on 21 April 1933. He remained in this office until 10 August 1936. He then became Chief Justice of the Straits Settlements (Penang, Malacca and Singapore) from 1936 to 1946. He was knighted in 1939. His photograph is in a display at the former Supreme Court of Singapore, now called The Arts House.

While Chief Justice of the Straits Settlements, McElwaine was unsympathetic to the idea of appointing "Asiatics", as he called Asians, to senior judicial posts. "I am doubtful whether any Asiatic is suitable for the post of Registrar of the Supreme Court, whatever his professional qualifications be," he declared on 29 August 1938.

During the Second World War, he was imprisoned for six months in Changi Prison and afterwards in Taiwan (where he wrote notes on his life which are now kept at the Imperial War Museum in London) and Mukden in Manchuria.

He died on 24 October 1969 in Devon, at the age of 85.

References

External links
Picture of McElwaine in Chongqing after his release from internment

1884 births
1969 deaths
People from County Roscommon
People educated at Campbell College
Alumni of Trinity College Dublin
Irish officers in the British Army
Irish people of World War I
Royal Ulster Rifles officers
British Army personnel of World War I
Straits Settlements judges
Attorneys General of the Colony of Fiji
Attorneys-general of Fiji
Chief Justices of the Straits Settlements
Attorneys-General of Singapore
Ethnic minority members of the Legislative Council of Fiji
Straits Settlements people
British expatriates in Kenya
World War II civilian prisoners held by Japan
British people imprisoned abroad
British expatriates in Fiji
British Kenya people
Colony of Fiji people
Expatriate judges from Ireland